The 2001 Cork Junior A Hurling Championship was the 104th staging of the Cork Junior A Hurling Championship since its establishment by the Cork County Board in 1895. The championship began on 30 September 2001 and ended on 11 November 2001.

On 11 November 2001, Courcey Rovers won the championship following a 3-9 to 3-7 defeat of Charleville in the final. This was their first championship title in the grade.

Charleville's John Quinlan was the championship's top scorer with 2-15.

Qualification

Results

First round

Semi-finals

Final

Championship statistics

Top scorers

Overall

In a single game

Miscellaneous

 Diarmuid Ó Mathúna's qualified for the championship for the very first time in their history.

References

Cork Junior Hurling Championship
Cork Junior Hurling Championship